Events in the year 2021 in Kiribati.

Incumbents
 President: Taneti Maamau
 Vice President: Teuea Toatu

Events
Ongoing — COVID-19 pandemic in Kiribati

Deaths

24 June – Paul Mea, Roman Catholic prelate, bishop of Tarawa and Nauru (born 1939).

See also
History of Kiribati

References

 
2020s in Kiribati
Years of the 21st century in Kiribati
Kiribati
Kiribati